Momčilo Bajagić (born 19 February 1960), better known under pseudonym Bajaga, is a Serbian rock musician. He is best known as the leader of the Serbian and former Yugoslav rock band Bajaga i Instruktori, as well as a former member of the rock band Riblja Čorba.

Biography

Early career
Bajagić started his musical career as a singer for the band TNT. He wrote his first song lyrics (for the song "Dvadeseta noć", trans. "Twentieth Night") as a member of this band. After TNT disbanded in 1976, Bajagić joined the band Ofi led by organist Toma "Ofinger" Stojković. After Stojković left the band, Bajagić and two other Ofi members, drummer Dragan "Đera" Đerić and vocalist Živorad "Žika" Milenković, formed the band Glogov Kolac (Hawthorn Stake) with guitarist Rajko Kojić. After only one performance Glogov Kolac, disbanded. Bajagić refused Boban Petrović's invitation to join Zdravo, while Kojić joined the band SOS and later Riblja Čorba.

Riblja Čorba
In 1978, on suggestion of Bajagić's former bandmate Rajko Kojić, Bajagić was invited to join Riblja Čorba as rhythm guitarist. Bajagić recorded six albums with the band. He wrote songs "Ja sam se ložio na tebe" ("I Was Crushing on You"), "Baby, Baby I Don't Wanna Cry", "Muzičari koji piju" ("Musicians Who Drink") and "Kad hodaš" ("When You Walk"). He co-wrote the songs "Dva dinara, druže" ("Two Dinars, Comrade"), "Nemoj srećo, nemoj danas" ("Don't Honey, Don't Do It Today"), "Kazablanka" ("Casablanca"), "Evo ti za taksi" ("Here's Some for the Cab"), "Draga, ne budi peder" ("Honey, Don't Be a Faggot"), "Dobro jutro" ("Good Morning"), "Odlazak u grad" ("Leaving to the City"), "Srećan put, pišo moja mala" ("Have A Nice Trip, My Little Winky"), and others.

Pozitivna geografija
During his work with Riblja Čorba, Bajagić wrote a number of humorous pop rock songs that did not fit into the band's hard rock sound and decided to release a solo album. He recorded the album Pozitivna geografija (Positive Geography) with musicians who would later become members of his band Bajaga i Instruktori: vocalist Dejan Cukić (a former Dizel, Tilt and Bulevar member), bass guitarist Miroslav "Cvele" Cvetković (a former Tilt, Pop Mašina and Papatra member), guitarist Nenad Stamtović (a former Tilt, Zebra, Suncokret and Bulevar member) and drummer Vladimir Golubović (a former Tilt, Suncokret and Riblja Čorba member). The album was produced by Kornelije Kovač and was released at the end of January 1984, bringing hits "Limene trube" ("Brass Trumpets"), "Tekila gerila" ("Tequila Guerilla"), "Mali slonovi" ("Little Elephants"), "Marlena", and "Pustite me, druže" ("Let Me Go, Comrade"). Although released as Bajagić's solo album, Pozitivna geografija was later included in Bajaga i Instruktori official discography, as it featured future Bajaga i Instruktori members. Bajagić and the musicians that were involved in the album recording performed in Kulušić club in Zagreb on 12 April 1984, and on 21 April in Dom Sindikata in Belgrade, appearing as Bajaga i Instruktori (Bajaga and the Instructors) for the first time on the latter concert.

At the time of the album recording, Bajagić wanted to remain a member of Riblja Čorba, but the popularity of his songs caused conflicts inside the band. In July 1984 he was, alongside Kojić, excluded from Riblja Čorba, and started a tour with his new band.

Bajaga i Instruktori

Led by Bajagić, Bajaga i Instruktori became one of the most successful and influential rock bands of the former Yugoslav and Serbian rock scene. Their string of albums in the mid-to-late 1980s placed them at the very top of the former Yugoslav rock scene, alongside other mega-selling bands such as Bijelo Dugme and Riblja Čorba. The band has released nine studio albums (including Pozitivna geografija).

Solo works
Bajagić has released two solo albums, both featuring soundtracks written by Bajagić: Ni na nebu ni na zemlji (for the film of the same name) and Profesionalac – Muzika iz filma (for the film The Professional). Bajagić recorded the latter with pop rock/folk rock band Apsolutno Romantično. He also composed the music for TV series Otvorena Vrata.

Album production
Bajagić produced Bezobrazno Zeleno debut album BZ1 released in 1983. He produced Heroji only album, 88 (1988), as well as their 7" single "Bilder" / "Instruktor skijanja" ("Bodybuilder" / "Skiing Instructor", released in 1986). He produced his solo album Profesionalac – Muzika iz filma, and participated in the production of Bajaga i Instruktori releases Četiri godišnja doba (Four Seasons, released in 1991) and Muzika na struju (Electric Music, released in 1993).

Personal life
Bajagić completed primary and secondary education in Belgrade. He got married with Emilija Klikovac in 1989. and they have two children, son Marko and daughter Anđela.<ref>Моје песме имају мирис Београда Moje pesme imaju miris Beograda ("Politika", April 21. 2013)</ref>

Bajagić was elected on 5-year term as a member of the Assembly of the Crvena zvezda Basketball Club on 27 December 2021.

Awards
In 2021 he was awarded the Order of Karađorđe's Star.

Discography
With Riblja Čorba
Studio albums
 Kost u grlu (1979)
 Pokvarena mašta i prljave strasti (1981)
 Mrtva priroda (1981)
 Buvlja pijaca (1982)
 Večeras vas zabavljaju muzičari koji piju (1984)

Live albums
 U ime naroda (1982)

With Bajaga i Instruktori

 Pozitivna geografija (1984)
 Sa druge strane jastuka (1985)
 Jahači magle (1986)
 Prodavnica tajni (1988)
 Muzika na struju (1993)
 Od bižuterije do ćilibara (1997)
 Zmaj od Noćaja (2001)
 Šou počinje u ponoć (2005)
 Daljina, dim i prašina (2012)
 U sali lom (2018)
 Ovaj svet se menja (2020)

Solo
Soundtrack albums
 Ni na nebu ni na zemlji (1994)
 Profesionalac – Muzika iz filma (2003)
 Darja - Muzika iz filma "Hotel Beograd" (2020)

References

Bibliography
 EX YU ROCK enciklopedija 1960–2006'', Janjatović Petar;

External links
 
 Momčilo Bajagić at Discogs

1960 births
Living people
People from Bjelovar
Serbian rock singers
Serbian rock guitarists
Rhythm guitarists
Members of the Assembly of KK Crvena zvezda
Serbian singer-songwriters
Yugoslav rock singers
Yugoslav male singers
Yugoslav musicians
Serbian record producers
Musicians from Belgrade
Serbian baritones
Serbs of Croatia